Tracey Ellis is a Canadian actress, known for The Last of the Mohicans (1992), This Boy's Life (1993) and The Age of Innocence (1993).

Filmography

Film

Television

External links

Living people
Canadian television actresses
Place of birth missing (living people)
Year of birth missing (living people)
Canadian film actresses